Audrey Cefaly is an American playwright.

Career highlights 
Cefaly is a recipient of the 2017 Lambda Literary Award in the category of LGBTQ Drama (The Gulf), the 2016 Edgerton Foundation New American Play Award (The Gulf), and the 2017 David Calicchio Emerging American Playwright Prize. In January 2020 her play Alabaster was nominated for the Pulitzer by Florida Repertory Theatre.

Alabaster 
Cefaly's play Alabaster won the 2017 David Calicchio Emerging American Playwright Prize from Marin Theatre Company. In January 2020 the play embarked on a record-breaking 11-city National New Play Network Rolling World Premiere and was subsequently nominated for the Pulitzer by Florida Repertory Theatre.

The Gulf 
Cefaly's play The Gulf won the 40th Annual Samuel French OOB Festival. Its full length adaptation received its world premiere at Signature Theatre, Arlington, VA, in September 2016 (directed by Joe Calarco). In 2017, it was nominated for the Charles MacArthur Award for Outstanding Original New Play or Musical (Helen Hayes Awards) and in 2018, the play won the Lambda Literary Award in the category of LGBTQ Drama.

Love is a Blue Tick Hound 
Cefaly's collection Love is a Blue Tick Hound is a collection of four one-acts (The Gulf, Fin & Euba, Clean and Stuck) and is published by Samuel French. It received its world premiere at Terrific New Theatre in Birmingham, AL, in of December 2016.

Maytag Virgin 
In October 2015, Cefaly directed the world premiere of her Southern drama Maytag Virgin as part of the inaugural Women's Voices Theatre Festival.

The Last Wide Open 
In February 2019, Cefaly's musical play The Last Wide Open (music by Matthew Nielson) received its world premiere at Cincinnati Playhouse in the Park.

Plays 
 Alabaster
 The Gulf
 Maytag Virgin
 Love is a Blue Tick Hound
 The Last Wide Open

Awards 
 Nomination: 2020 Pulitzer Prize 
Winner: 2018 Lambda Literary Award for LGBTQ Drama (The Gulf)
 Winner: 2017 David Calicchio Emerging American Playwright Prize (Alabaster)
 Nominee: 2017 Charles MacArthur Award for Outstanding Original New Play or Musical (Helen Hayes Awards) (The Gulf)
 Recipient: 2015 Edgerton New American Play Award (The Gulf)

Publications 
 Alabaster
 Maytag Virgin
 The Gulf
 Love is a Blue Tick Hound (includes one-acts):
 The Gulf
 Fin & Euba
 Clean
 Stuck
 Off Off Broadway Festival Plays, 40th Series
 Best American Short Plays 2014-2015
 Best American Short Plays 2004-2005

References

External links 
 

Living people
Date of birth missing (living people)
Writers from Alabama
21st-century American dramatists and playwrights
Place of birth missing (living people)
Lambda Literary Award for Drama winners
American women dramatists and playwrights
21st-century American women writers
Year of birth missing (living people)